The following is a list of winners of the Golden Calf for best long feature film at the NFF.

Trivia 
 13 former "best feature film"-winners where the Dutch submission for the Academy Award for Best International Film, including Oscar-nominee Twin Sisters and Oscar-winner Character. The other two Dutch Oscar-winners, The Assault and Antonia's Line, didn't win the Golden Calf for Best Feature Film. Oscar-nominee Paradise Now from Dutch-Palestinian filmmaker Hany Abu-Assad was submitted by Palestine.
 Hans, Life Before Death is so far the only Documentary-film to ever win this prize. According to the "Jaarboek film 1984" by Hans Beerekamp, this was a compromise choice when the Golden Calf-jury and organizers of the Netherlands Film Festival didn't agree on the final winner. 
 Oink is the only animated film to win this prize.
 Most of the films that won are predominantly Dutch or English spoken. However it has happened three times that a film won in one of the minority languages spoken in the Kingdom of the Netherlands: Nynke in West Frisian, Son of Mine in Limburgish and Buladó in Papiamento.
 Ben Sombogaart is the only director who directed three of the winning films. Joram Lursen, Jos Stelling, Jean van de Velde, Alex van Warmerdam, Pieter Verhoeff and Paul Verhoeven all directed two.

See also 
List of Dutch submissions for the Academy Award for Best International Feature Film

References

Sources
 Golden Calf Awards (Dutch)
 NFF Website

Best Long feature film
Awards for best film